Thibault Lassalle (born 22 August 1987) is a French professional rugby union player. He currently plays at lock for Oyonnax in the ProD2.

Personal life
Lassalle's father is French politician Jean Lassalle who has been a member of the National Assembly for the Pyrénées-Atlantiques' 4th constituency since 2002 and was a candidate for the 2017 French presidential election.

References

External links
 L'Équipe profile
 Castres profile
 Ligue Nationale De Rugby Profile
 European Professional Club Rugby Profile

Living people
1987 births
French rugby union players
Rugby union locks
SU Agen Lot-et-Garonne players
Oyonnax Rugby players
RC Toulonnais players
Castres Olympique players
People from Oloron-Sainte-Marie
Sportspeople from Pyrénées-Atlantiques